Covenant Health is a Catholic health care provider that serves the Canadian province of Alberta. It was established on October 7, 2008, by Patrick Dumelie, following the amalgamation of Alberta's regional Catholic health care providers under a single administration.

The organization is governed by a board of directors that consists of 11 individuals, who are appointed by, and accountable to, the Catholic Bishops of Alberta, which itself includes 5 Latin bishops and 1 Ukrainian Catholic bishop. The board has been chaired by former Alberta premier Ed Stelmach since 2016.

According to Covenant Health, it is one of the largest Catholic health care providers in Canada, employing over 11,000 staff, physicians and volunteers in 16 facilities in 11 communities across Alberta in cooperation with Alberta Health Services. Services provided include acute care, continuing care, assisted living, hospice, rehabilitation, ambulance services,  respite care, and seniors' housing.

Covenant Health sites

Notes

External links

Hospital networks in Canada
Hospitals in Alberta
Catholic health care
2008 establishments in Alberta
Organizations established in 2008
Catholic organizations established in the 21st century